The 2021–22 Rugby Europe Women's Trophy was the 21st edition of Rugby Europe's second division competition for women's national rugby union teams. It will be contested in two pools. Pool A plays a single round-robin while Pool B will only play matches they can play. Sweden won the Trophy championship after beating Switzerland 48–0 in the final round.

Standings

Results

Round 1 

| width="50%" valign="top" |

Round 2 

| width="50%" valign="top" |

Round 3 

| width="50%" valign="top" |

Round 4

Round 5

Round 6

Round 7

Round 8 

| width="50%" valign="top" |

References

2021
Rugby Europe Women's Trophy
Rugby Europe Women's Trophy
Rugby union in the Czech Republic
Rugby union in Finland
Rugby union in Sweden
Rugby union in Switzerland
Rugby union in Belgium
Rugby union in Germany
Rugby union in Portugal